Roy Emerson successfully defended his title, defeating Fred Stolle 6–2, 6–4, 6–4 in the final to win the gentlemen's singles tennis title at the 1965 Wimbledon Championships.

Seeds

  Roy Emerson (champion)
  Fred Stolle (final)
  Jan-Erik Lundqvist (second round)
  Dennis Ralston (semifinals)
  Wilhelm Bungert (third round)
  John Newcombe (fourth round)
  Tony Roche (second round)
  Rafael Osuna (quarterfinals)

Draw

Finals

Top half

Section 1

Section 2

Section 3

Section 4

Bottom half

Section 5

Section 6

Section 7

Section 8

References

External links

Men's Singles
Wimbledon Championship by year – Men's singles